Keyvan Khosrovani (born 29 July 1938) is an Iranian architect and designer based in Paris, France. Born in Tehran in 1938, he was educated in Iran, France, and Italy. He left his homeland a year before the Islamic revolution as an exile for life and was granted French citizenship.

He has contributed to the tradition, innovation and continuity of Persian architecture and crafts. Inn of Nain or "Mehmansaray Nayin" the hotel and guesthouse he designed in 1967 remains his manifesto; it is undoubtedly his most enduring project representing his belief that new architecture can be both respectful of the past while propagating new ideas for changing lifestyles.

For thirteen years he was the pro bono designer of Empress Farah Pahlavi's official wardrobe creating a royal haute couture. His practice of high fashion design and his style simultaneously promoted and innovated Persian crafts.

References

External links

Iranian architects
Iranian fashion designers
1938 births
Living people